James Bongani Kamte (born 20 July 1982), nicknamed "Cobra", is a South African professional golfer. He has played on the Sunshine Tour, Challenge Tour, European Tour, and Asian Tour. He earned his tour card for the 2008 European Tour season by finishing in the top 30 of the qualifying school.

Early life
Kamte was a football player in his childhood and his nickname, "Cobra", comes from his football days.

He grew up in Kwanomzamo Humansdorp, and received a bursary through several Golf clubs in the St Francis area and Nomads Golf Club, to attend Woodridge College where he matriculated in 2000.

Career overview
James Kamte turned professional in 2003 after representing Gauteng in the Under-23 division, and subsequently in the Gauteng Seniors side.

Career highlights
2007 was successful for Kamte. On the Sunshine Tour, he started his run on 2 July by finishing second in the Samsung Royal Swazi Sun Open, closely followed by another second-place finish at the Vodacom Origins Tournament in Pretoria a week later.

On the European Challenge Tour, Kamte's best finish has been second place in the Kenya Open in Nairobi, Kenya. He also had a fourth-place finish at the Vodafone Challenge in Germany.

After a good run of form, James went on to win his first Sunshine Tour victory at the Seekers Travel Pro-Am tournament at the Dainfern Country Club, Johannesburg on 8 September 2007.

On 8 June 2009, Kamte qualified for the 2009 U.S. Open through sectional qualifying in Columbus, Ohio.

He won his fourth Sunshine Tour event at the BMG Classic in 2011.

European Tour – 2008
Kamte came through the European Tour qualifying school, finishing tied for 22nd place, right on the cut-off line for the top 30 and ties who earn their playing privileges on the main European Tour for the 2008 season. This made him the first black South African player to earn European Tour playing privileges since Vincent Tshabalala in 1976. He ended the season ranked 138th on the Order of Merit, meaning Kamte would have limited playing opportunities for the 2009 season.

Kamte followed up his performance at the European qualifying school by winning the Sunshine Tour's Dimension Data Pro-Am in January 2008, becoming the first black South African golfer to win an event on the summer swing of that tour.

Asian Tour – 2009
With limited status on the European Tour, Kamte entered the Asian Tour qualifying school for 2009 and finished fourth. He followed up this success by winning the first event of the 2009 season, the Asian Tour International in Thailand, thus guaranteeing Kamte starts in events co-sanctioned by the Asian and European tours for the remainder of the season.

Amateur highlights
Ranked 5th in South Africa before turning professional
SA Presidents Team Colours 2003 (Captain)
2nd North Province Open Strokeplay (2003)
T3rd SA Amateur Strokeplay 2002
2nd Nomads Central Gauteng Under-23 Open 2002
1st Gauteng North Open 2002
3rd Freestate/Northern Cape Open 2002
7th Gauteng North Etonic Strokeplay 2002
Ernie Els Foundation Member 2000–2003
2nd Gauteng Strokeplay 2001

Professional wins (5)

Asian Tour wins (1)

Sunshine Tour wins (4)

Sunshine Tour playoff record (1–0)

Results in major championships

CUT = missed the half-way cut
Note: Kamte only played in the U.S. Open.

See also
2007 European Tour Qualifying School graduates
2009 European Tour Qualifying School graduates
List of African golfers

References

External links

South African male golfers
European Tour golfers
Sunshine Tour golfers
Asian Tour golfers
Golfers from Johannesburg
Sportspeople from the Eastern Cape
People from Humansdorp
1982 births
Living people